Peter Bergman gallery is a Swedish art gallery in Stockholm opened in 2002 by Peter Bergman. It currently represents the following artists : Anna Bjerger, Peter Ern, Roger Hansson, Paul Housley, Daniel Jensen, Oskar Korsár, Katarina Lönnby, Lisa D. Manner, Martin Mannig, Stefan Otto, Helén Svensson, Karin Wikström, Kristoffer Zetterstrand, Martin Ålund.

External links
Peter Bergman Gallery website

Contemporary art galleries in Sweden
Art museums and galleries in Stockholm
Art galleries established in 2002
2002 establishments in Sweden